Rajiv Gandhi Sports Complex is a sports stadium in Rohtak, Haryana. The stadium was established in 2012 and is owned by Haryana Urban Development Authority. The stadium is primer ports venue in the city with capacity of 8,000 with international standard facilities The stadium has got facilities for various sports like cricket, football, hockey etc. There are also facilities for indoor sports such as basketball, badminton, gymnastics, handball, volleyball, lawn tennis, table tennis, weight lifting and Kabbadi etc.

The stadium was built with the cost of Rs. 151 crores

References

External links
 Wikimapia

Cricket grounds in Haryana
Field hockey venues in India
Rohtak
Sports venues completed in 2015
2015 establishments in Haryana